Curvibacter lanceolatus is a Gram-negative, nonmotile, non-spore-forming  bacterium from the genus Curvibacter and family Comamonadaceae, which was isolated from well water. Colonies of C. lanceolatus are yellow–brown in color.

References

External links
Type strain of Curvibacter lanceolatus at BacDive -  the Bacterial Diversity Metadatabase

Burkholderiaceae
Bacteria described in 2004